Berrysville is an unincorporated community in Highland County, in the U.S. state of Ohio.

History
Berrysville was laid out in 1846, and named in honor of the local Berryman family. A post office called Berrysville was established in 1851, and remained in operation until 1909.

References

Unincorporated communities in Highland County, Ohio
Unincorporated communities in Ohio